Never Mind the Bombings, Here's Your Six Figures is the second release from American screamo band United Nations. The four-song EP was released on June 23, 2010 through Deathwish Inc. on both 7" vinyl and digital download versions. The song "Pity Animal" was previously released in April 2010 on MMX, a free downloadable Deathwish sampler album.

Prior to the release of United Nations' self-titled debut album in 2008, Never Mind the Bombings, Here's Your Six Figures was announced to be the group's second album and follow up to United Nations. The EP was expected to face copyright issues for sharing a similar name and cover art to Sex Pistols' 1977 studio album Never Mind the Bollocks, Here's the Sex Pistols. The artwork for the EP was created by the Australian artist Ben Frost, and designed by Converge vocalist Jacob Bannon.

Track listing
 "Pity Animal" – 3:33
 "O You Bright & Risen Angels" – 2:17
 "Communication Letdown" – 2:18
 "Never Mind the Bombings, Here's Your Six Figures" – 3:31

Personnel 
Continuing with United Nations' ambiguity of contributors, the liner notes for Never Mind the Bombings, Here's Your Six Figures provide neither writing nor production credits.

References

External links
Stream of "Pity Animal" at Deathwish Inc.

2010 EPs
United Nations (band) albums
Albums with cover art by Jacob Bannon
Deathwish Inc. EPs